Grass Lake is a natural lake in South Dakota, in the United States and  Humboldt is the closet town to the lake.

Grass grew in abundance at Grass Lake, hence the name.

See also
List of lakes in South Dakota

References

Lakes of South Dakota
Lakes of Codington County, South Dakota